The Oversoul Seven Trilogy is a novel by author Jane Roberts. It consists of the three previously published books The Education of Oversoul Seven (1973), The Further Education of Oversoul Seven (1979), and Oversoul Seven and the Museum of Time (1984).

The Oversoul Seven Trilogy is a work of fiction based on the Seth Material. The Seth Material is a series of dictations on what it means to be human, claimed by their author to have been received via trance communications from a multidimensional being named Seth.  The Oversoul Seven Trilogy summarizes these teachings in novelized format, and explores the nature of consciousness and reality creation.

Editions 

 Amber Allen  Edition: Paperback; May 1, 1995

See also
 Seth Material

References

External links 
 Quotes from the Seth Books

1995 American novels
Literary trilogies
Visionary fiction
Works by Jane Roberts